André Marie Constant Duméril Zoologie analytique ou, Méthode naturelle de classification des animaux  rendue plus facile a l'aide de tableaux synoptique Paris, Allais.  Also published in German as Analytische Zoologie Weimar, Im Verlage des Landes-Industrie-Compto.  In this work which covers the Animalia as a whole dichotomous keys are used to separate taxa in a scientific approach.
 Anders Erikson Sparrman published an ornithology of Sweden titled Svensk Ornithologie.One of the many regional fauna s of Europe to appear in the nineteenth century.
 Johann Heinrich Friedrich Link catalogued the natural history collection of the University of Rostock in Beschreibung der Naturalien-Sammlung der Universitat zu Rostock.  In this work he proposed a new genus Alles to contain the little auk replacing the genus Alca of  Carl Linnaeus and separating it from the other auks.  For other changes of  the 546 bird names used  in the 10th edition of Systema Naturae see Aves in the 10th edition of Systema Naturae.

Birding and ornithology by year
1806 in science